Machining is a process in which a material (often metal) is cut to a desired final shape and size by a controlled material-removal process. The processes that have this common theme are collectively called subtractive manufacturing, which utilizes machine tools, in contrast to additive manufacturing (3D printing), which uses controlled addition of material.

Machining is a part of the manufacture of many metal products, but it can also be used on other materials such as wood, plastic, ceramic, and composite material. A person who specializes in machining is called a machinist. A room, building, or company where machining is done is called a machine shop. Much of modern-day machining is carried out by computer numerical control (CNC), in which computers are used to control the movement and operation of the mills, lathes, and other cutting machines. This increases efficiency, as the CNC machine runs unmanned therefore reducing labour costs for machine shops.

History and terminology 
The precise meaning of the term machining has evolved over the past one and a half centuries as technology has advanced. In the 18th century, the word machinist simply meant a person who built or repaired machines. This person's work was done mostly by hand, using processes such as the carving of wood and the hand-forging and hand-filing of metal. At the time, millwrights and builders of new kinds of engines (meaning, more or less, machines of any kind), such as James Watt or John Wilkinson, would fit the definition. The noun machine tool and the verb to machine (machined, machining) did not yet exist.

Around the middle of the 20th century, the latter words were coined as the concepts that they described evolved into widespread existence. Therefore, during the Machine Age, machining referred to (what we today might call) the "traditional" machining processes, such as turning, boring, drilling, milling, broaching, sawing, shaping, planing, abrasive cutting, reaming, and tapping. In these "traditional" or "conventional" machining processes, machine tools, such as lathes, milling machines, drill presses, or others, are used with a sharp cutting tool to remove material to achieve a desired geometry.

Since the advent of new technologies in the post–World War II era, such as electrical discharge machining, electrochemical machining, electron beam machining, photochemical machining, and ultrasonic machining, the retronym "conventional machining" can be used to differentiate those classic technologies from the newer ones. In current usage, the term "machining" without qualification usually implies the traditional machining processes.

In the decades of the 2000s and 2010s, as additive manufacturing (AM) evolved beyond its earlier laboratory and rapid prototyping contexts and began to become common throughout all phases of manufacturing, the term subtractive manufacturing became common retronymously in logical contrast with AM, covering essentially any removal processes also previously covered by the term machining. The two terms are effectively synonymous, although the long-established usage of the term machining continues. This is comparable to the idea that the verb sense of contact evolved because of the proliferation of ways to contact someone (telephone, email, IM, SMS, and so on) but did not entirely replace the earlier terms such as call, talk to, or write to.

Machining operations

The three principal machining processes are classified as turning, drilling and milling. Other operations falling into miscellaneous categories include shaping, planing, boring, broaching and sawing.

Turning operations are those that rotate the workpiece as the primary method of moving metal against the cutting tool. Lathes are the principal machine tool used in turning.
Milling operations are operations in which the cutting tool rotates to bring cutting edges to bear against the workpiece. Milling machines are the principal machine tool used in milling.
Drilling operations are those in which holes are produced or refined by bringing a rotating cutter with cutting edges at the lower extremity into contact with the workpiece. Drilling operations are done primarily in drill presses but sometimes on lathes or mills.
Miscellaneous operations may not be strictly machining, in that they may not produce swarf, but are still performed at a typical machine tool. Burnishing is an example; it produces no swarf but can be performed at a lathe, mill, or drill press.

An unfinished workpiece requiring machining will need to have some material cut away to create a finished product. A finished product would be a workpiece that meets the specifications set out for that workpiece by engineering drawings or blueprints. For example, a workpiece may be required to have a specific outside diameter. A lathe is a machine tool that can be used to create that diameter by rotating a metal workpiece, so that a cutting tool can cut metal away, creating a smooth, round surface matching the required diameter and surface finish. A drill can be used to remove metal in the shape of a cylindrical hole. Other tools that may be used for various types of metal removal are milling machines, saws, and grinding machines. Many of these same techniques are used in woodworking.

As a commercial venture, machining is generally performed in a machine shop, which consists of one or more workrooms containing major machine tools. Although a machine shop can be a stand-alone operation, many businesses maintain internal machine shops which support specialized needs of the business.

Machining requires attention to many details for a workpiece to meet the specifications set out in the engineering drawings or blueprints. Beside the obvious problems related to correct dimensions, there is the problem of achieving the correct finish or surface smoothness on the workpiece. The inferior finish found on the machined surface of a workpiece may be caused by incorrect clamping, a dull tool, or inappropriate presentation of a tool. Frequently, this poor surface finish, known as chatter, is evident by an undulating or irregular finish, and the appearance of waves on the machined surfaces of the workpiece.

Overview of machining technology
Machining is any process in which a cutting tool is used to remove small chips of material from the workpiece (the workpiece is often called the "work"). To perform the operation, relative motion is required between the tool and the work. This relative motion is achieved in most machining operation by means of a primary motion, called "cutting speed" and a secondary motion called "feed". The shape of the tool and its penetration into the work surface, combined with these motions, produce the desired shape of the resulting work surface.

Machining operations

There are many kinds of machining operations, each of which is capable of generating a certain part geometry and surface texture.

In turning, a cutting tool with a single cutting edge is used to remove material from a rotating workpiece to generate a cylindrical shape. The primary motion is provided by rotating the workpiece, and the feed motion is achieved by moving the cutting tool slowly in a direction parallel to the axis of rotation of the workpiece.

Drilling is used to create a round hole. It is accomplished by a rotating tool that typically has two or four helical cutting edges. The tool is fed in a direction parallel to its axis of rotation into the workpiece to form the round hole.

In boring, a tool with a single bent pointed tip is advanced into a roughly made hole in a spinning workpiece to slightly enlarge the hole and improve its accuracy. It is a fine finishing operation used in the final stages of product manufacture.

Reaming is one of the sizing operations that removes a small amount of metal from a hole already drilled.

In milling, a rotating tool with multiple cutting edges is moved slowly relative to the material to generate a plane or straight surface. The direction of the feed motion is perpendicular to the tool's axis of rotation. The speed motion is provided by the rotating milling cutter. The two basic forms of milling are:
 Peripheral milling
 Face milling.

Other conventional machining operations include shaping, planing, broaching and sawing. Also, grinding and similar abrasive operations are often included within the category of machining.

Cutting tool

A cutting tool has one or more sharp cutting edges and is made of a material that is harder than the work material. The cutting edge serves to separate chip from the parent work material. Connected to the cutting edge are the two surfaces of the tool:
 The rake face; and
 The flank.

The rake face which directs the flow of newly formed chip, is oriented at a certain angle is called the rake angle "α". It is measured relative to the plane perpendicular to the work surface. The rake angle can be positive or negative. The flank of the tool provides a clearance between the tool and the newly formed work surface, thus protecting the surface from abrasion, which would degrade the finish. This angle between the work surface and the flank surface is called the relief angle. There are two basic types of cutting tools:
 Single point tool; and
 Multiple-cutting-edge tool

A single point tool has one cutting edge and is used for turning, boring and planing. During machining, the point of the tool penetrates below the original work surface of the workpart. The point is sometimes rounded to a certain radius, called the nose radius.

Multiple-cutting-edge tools have more than one cutting edge and usually achieve their motion relative to the workpart by rotating. Drilling and milling use rotating multiple-cutting-edge tools. Although the shapes of these tools are different from a single-point tool, many elements of tool geometry are similar.

Cutting conditions
Relative motion is required between the tool and work to perform a machining operation. The primary motion is accomplished at a certain cutting speed. In addition, the tool must be moved laterally across the work. This is a much slower motion, called the feed. The remaining dimension of the cut is the penetration of the cutting tool below the original work surface, called the depth of cut. Collectively, speed, feed, and depth of cut are called the cutting conditions. They form the three dimensions of the machining process, and for certain operations, their product can be used to obtain the material removal rate for the process:

where
 – the material removal rate in mm3/s, (in3/s),
 – the cutting speed in mm/s, (in/min),
 – the feed in mm, (in),
 – the depth of cut in mm, (in).

Note: All units must be converted to the corresponding decimal (or USCU) units.

Stages in metal cutting
Machining operations usually divide into two categories, distinguished by purpose and cutting conditions:
 Roughing cuts
 Finishing cuts

Roughing cuts are used to remove large amount of material from the starting workpart as rapidly as possible, i.e. with a large Material Removal Rate (MRR), in order to produce a shape close to the desired form, but leaving some material on the piece for a subsequent finishing operation.
Finishing cuts are used to complete the part and achieve the final dimension, tolerances, and surface finish. In production machining jobs, one or more roughing cuts are usually performed on the work, followed by one or two finishing cuts. Roughing operations are done at high feeds and depths – feeds of 0.4–1.25 mm/rev (0.015–0.050 in/rev) and depths of 2.5–20 mm (0.100–0.750 in) are typical, but actual values depend on the workpiece materials. Finishing operations are carried out at low feeds and depths – feeds of 0.0125–0.04 mm/rev (0.0005–0.0015 in/rev) and depths of 0.75–2.0 mm (0.030–0.075 in) are typical. Cutting speeds are lower in roughing than in finishing.

A cutting fluid is often applied to the machining operation to cool and lubricate the cutting tool. Determining whether a cutting fluid should be used, and, if so, choosing the proper cutting fluid, is usually included within the scope of cutting condition.

Today other forms of metal cutting are becoming increasingly popular. An example of this is water jet cutting. Water jet cutting involves pressurized water in excess of 620 MPa (90 000 psi) and is able to cut metal and have a finished product. This process is called cold cutting, which eliminates the damage caused by a heat affected zone, as opposed to laser and plasma cutting.

Relationship of subtractive and additive techniques
With the recent proliferation of additive manufacturing technologies, conventional machining has been retronymously classified, in thought and language, as a subtractive manufacturing method. In narrow contexts, additive and subtractive methods may compete with each other. In the broad context of entire industries, their relationship is complementary. Each method has its own advantages over the other. While additive manufacturing methods can produce very intricate prototype designs impossible to replicate by machining, strength and material selection may be limited.

See also

Abrasive flow machining
Abrasive jet machining
Biomachining
Cutting
Design for manufacturability for CNC machining
Chip formation
Machinability
Machine tools
Machine shop
Machining vibrations
Tool management

References

Bibliography

Further reading
 

 "Machine Tool Practices", 6th edition, by R.R.; Kibbe, J.E.; Neely, R.O.; Meyer & W.T.; White, 2nd printing, copyright 1999, 1995, 1991, 1987, 1982 and 1979 by Prentice Hall.

External links 
www.nmri.go.jp/eng, Elementary knowledge of metalworking
Videos about machining published by Institut für den Wissenschaftlichen Film. Available in the AV-Portal of the German National Library of Science and Technology.
Crankshaft Machining